The Simba Union Ground is one of several cricket grounds in Nairobi. It is also the home of Simba Union Cricket Club as well as the home of Cricket Kenya academy. The ground is located across the road from Kenya's main Cricket ground the Nairobi Gymkhana Club. The ground has hosted a One Day International match when Kenya cricket team played against West Indies cricket team.

One Day International Matches
List of ODI matches hosted at this stadium

List of Centuries

One Day Internationals

List of Five Wicket Hauls

One Day Internationals

References

 Ground Profile

Sport in Nairobi
Cricket grounds in Kenya